Cove School is a coeducational secondary school located in the Cove area of Farnborough in the English county of Hampshire.

It was first established as Cove and South Hawley Council School in June 1877 in buildings on Fernhill Road now occupied by Cove Junior School. The school transferred to its present site in 1937. Today Cove is a foundation school administered by Hampshire County Council, which coordinates the schools admissions.

References

External links
Cove School official website

Secondary schools in Hampshire
Farnborough, Hampshire
Foundation schools in Hampshire